Dumitru Popescu (17 March 1942 – 27 December 1997) was a Romanian footballer who played as a midfielder.

International career
Dumitru Popescu played seven games at international level for Romania, including appearances at Euro 1964 and 1968 qualifiers and at the 1966 World Cup qualifiers.

Honours
Steaua București
Divizia A: 1967–68
Cupa României: 1965–66, 1966–67, 1968–69

References

External links
Dumitru Popescu at Labtof.ro

1942 births
1997 deaths
Romanian footballers
Romania international footballers
Association football midfielders
Liga I players
Liga II players
FC Sportul Studențesc București players
FC Progresul București players
FC Steaua București players
Chimia Râmnicu Vâlcea players
FCV Farul Constanța players